"Endgame" is the series finale of the American science fiction television series Star Trek: Voyager, episodes 25 and 26 of the seventh season and 171 and 172 in the overall series. It was originally shown May 23, 2001, on the UPN network as a double-length episode and later presented as such in DVD collections, but it is shown in syndicated broadcasts as a two-part story.

Plot
In the year 2404, the Federation and the re-assembled crew of Voyager are celebrating the 10th anniversary of the ship's return to Earth, 23 years after it was stranded in the Delta Quadrant. Kathryn Janeway – now an admiral – reminisces with her crew, but reflects on the high personal costs of the long journey. She launches a plot to undo some of them by intervening at a key point in their history, changing a decision she now regrets. She steals an illegal time travel device and – with the reluctant help of now-Captain Harry Kim – takes a shuttlecraft back to 2378, where she meets up with Voyager, still in the Delta Quadrant. She pulls rank on younger Captain Janeway and orders the ship to return to a nebula filled with Borg that they had passed a few days before. She provides advanced technologies that allow Voyager to survive the massive Borg defenses, destroy two Borg vessels, and enter a transwarp corridor, which the Borg use for interstellar travel. Voyager comes upon a Borg transwarp hub, which connects distant parts of the galaxy, and could save the ship from sixteen more years stranded in the Delta Quadrant.

However, Captain Janeway wants to use Admiral Janeway's future technology to instead destroy the transwarp network; this can only be done from its terminus in the Delta Quadrant. Admiral Janeway explains that 23 additional crew members will die on the remainder of their trip home, including Seven of Nine (whose death will emotionally devastate Chakotay), and that Tuvok will become mentally unstable from a neurological condition that could have been treated in the Alpha Quadrant. Troubled by the choice, Captain Janeway discusses the issue with the crew, who agree that destroying the hub – severely diminishing the Borg threat to the Alpha Quadrant – is more important. The admiral is inspired by their spirit, and works with the captain on a scheme to do both.

The admiral takes her shuttlecraft and enters the transwarp hub, arriving at the Unicomplex – the center of all Borg activity and the home of the Borg Queen. She pretends to offer a deal in defiance of the captain's plans: her future technologies, in exchange for sending Voyager safely home. However, the Queen captures the admiral and begins to assimilate her into the Borg collective. Admiral Janeway then turns the tables by unleashing a pathogen she was carrying in her bloodstream into the collective, devastating it and killing the Queen. The Unicomplex suffers a cascade failure and explodes, killing the admiral as well.

Meanwhile, Captain Janeway and Voyager have entered a transwarp corridor, pursued by a surviving Borg sphere that is trying to destroy Voyager and crew in a last-chance attempt to create a time-travel paradox that will undo the devastating damage that Admiral Janeway has just done. Unable to fight back against the sphere's defenses, Captain Janeway takes Voyager inside it, destroying it from the inside just as they emerge from the collapsing transwarp corridor near Earth. They are met by a fleet of Starfleet vessels that had been sent to confront the Borg, which instead escort Voyager home to Earth.

Production
It was originally expected that a character would die in order to return Voyager to Earth, with Kate Mulgrew saying in an interview that one of the characters would die in one of the final frames of the series finale – but added that it didn't mean she was saying that it would be Janeway who would perish. In 2015, Brannon Braga stated on Twitter that he felt that it should have been Seven of Nine who died in the finale, and that he had written the episode "Human Error" specifically to set this up.

Awards
This episode won two Emmy Awards, which only four other Star Trek episodes have done. It won for Outstanding Music Composition For A Series (Dramatic Underscore) (Jay Chattaway) and Outstanding Special Visual Effects for a Series, in both cases beating the Voyager episode "Workforce", which was also nominated in those categories. "Endgame" was also nominated for Outstanding Sound Editing For A Series.

Reception
In 2015, SyFy ranked "Endgame" as one of the top ten episodes of the series.

In 2016, the fiftieth anniversary of the franchise, multiple publications included "Endgame" in episode rankings. The Hollywood Reporter rated "Endgame" the 54th best television episode of all Star Trek franchise television prior to Star Trek: Discovery, including live-action and the animated series but not counting the movies. They also ranked "Endgame" the 6th best episode of the Star Trek: Voyager series. SyFy ranked "Endgame" as the third best finale of Star Trek series up to 2016. SyFy ranked "Endgame" as the 8th best time travel plot in Star Trek. Empire ranked this the 48th best out of the top 50 episodes of all the 700 plus Star Trek television episodes. Radio Times ranked the return of the USS Voyager to Earth as the 30th greatest moment in all Star Trek, including films and television up to that time.

In 2019, Nerdist rated Captain Kathryn Janeway one of the top seven time-traveling characters in all of Star Trek for her role in "Endgame". The same year, Nerdist also suggested watching "Endgame" as part of an abbreviated binge-watching guide featuring USS Voyagers confrontations with the Borg. They also ranked it as the 5th best time-travel episode of all Star Trek in between "Tomorrow is Yesterday" (#6) and "All Good Things..." (#4).

Also in 2019, SyFy recommend this episode for its Seven of Nine binge-watching guide.

In 2021, ScreenRant ranked "Endgame" the sixth best episode with the Borg, based on an IMDB rating of 8.6 out 10.

Novelization 
A novelized version of "Endgame" was adapted by Diane Carey, and published in 2002. Some related Star Trek episodes were also novelized, including the Star Trek: Voyager television premiere "Caretaker", which was released as a 278-page novel called "Caretaker", and as an audiobook in 1995 by Simon & Schuster.

Two additional novels based on Voyager's return are Homecoming and The Farther Shore, both by Christie Golden.

Notes

See also
Endgame (Stargate SG-1) (this is also the title an episode of a similarly named TV series that aired the following year)

References

External links

 
  

2001 American television episodes
Fiction set in the 25th century
American television series finales
Television episodes written by Rick Berman
Television episodes written by Brannon Braga
Emmy Award-winning episodes
Star Trek time travel episodes
Star Trek: Voyager (season 7) episodes